Tasley is a village and civil parish in Shropshire, England.

It is located to the immediate west of the town of Bridgnorth, and the A458 road passes through. As well as the small historic village and farms, the parish includes some modern suburban housing and livestock market/auction hall that form part of the built-up area of Bridgnorth.

See also
Listed buildings in Tasley

References

External links

Tasley Parish Council

Villages in Shropshire
Civil parishes in Shropshire